The United States Numbered Highways in Oregon are the segments of the national United States Numbered Highways System that are owned and maintained by the U.S. state of Oregon. On a national level, the standards and numbering for the system are handled by the American Association of State Highway and Transportation Officials (AASHTO), while the highways in Oregon are maintained by the Oregon Department of Transportation (ODOT).



Mainline highways

Auxiliary highways

References

 
U.S.